7th State may refer to:
Maryland, one of the original Thirteen Colonies, and the seventh to ratify the Constitution of the United States of America in 1788
Veracruz, one of the founding states of Mexico, and the seventh to ratify the Constitution of the Federal Republic of Mexico in 1823
List of proposed states of Australia, which would add a seventh state to the existing six states of the Commonwealth of Australia
Proposed Northern Territory statehood, the most commonly-mentioned proposal for a seventh state of Australia